Mithridates I of Media Atropatene, sometimes known as Mithridates I and Mithridates of Media (100 BC-66 BC) was a King of Media Atropatene.

Although Mithridates I was a Median Prince, little is known on his lineage and his life. In or before 67 BC, Mithridates I married an unnamed Armenian Princess from the Artaxiad Dynasty who was a daughter of the Armenian King Tigranes the Great and, possibly, his wife, Cleopatra of Pontus.

Mithridates I ruled from 67 to c. 66 BC. Mithridates I is mentioned by Cassius Dio in the last campaign against the Roman General Lucullus in 67 BC. He was supporting Tigranes, when his father-in-law went to war against the Romans to invade Cappadocia in 67 BC. There is a possibility that Mithridates I was present with Tigranes the Great and the King Mithridates VI of Pontus, when Tigranes and Mithridates VI were defeated by Lucullus at the Arsanias River in 66 BC.

Mithridates I appeared to have died in c. 66 BC, as his relative Darius I was King of Media Atropatene in c. 65 BC. According to modern genealogies, Mithridates I and his Armenian wife are presented in being the parents of a child, a son called Ariobarzanes I which can explain the claims of Mithridates I's descendants to the Armenian Kingship in opposition to the lasting ruling monarchs of the Artaxiad Dynasty.

References

Sources
 C. Toumanoff, Manual genealogy and chronology for the Christian Caucasus (Armenia, Georgia, Albania), ED. Aquila, Rome, 1976
 Ancient Library article on Mithridates
 Ptolemaic Genealogy: Tryphaena 
 Azerbaijan iii. Pre-Islamic History, Atropates, Persian satrap of Media, made himself independent in 321 B.C. Thereafter Greek and Latin writers named the territory as Media Atropatene or, less frequently, Media Minor: Parthian period

1st-century BC Iranian monarchs
Rulers of Media Atropatene